is a space hentai OVA influenced by the Alien franchise, directed by Norio Takanami, that was released in 1996.

Plot
While on a government mission far from civilization, the all-female crew of the spaceship Muze finds a seemingly lifeless ship, named the Zogne, drifting in space. They investigate and stumble across numerous dead bodies as well as a single survivor — Flair Mytomeyer, an innocuous-looking girl, who is diagnosed with amnesia after being found in a sleep chamber. The crew bring the girl back to the Muze and treat her with sympathy as a medical patient. Computer expert Hikari begins attempting to decrypt the computer records of the Zogne to find out what happened to its crew.

After further searching, Hikari discovers the illegal drug Metrogria (which disables the immune system) on the Zogne, and the Captain of the Muze commands that the Zogne be destroyed. Meanwhile, Flair (who is actually a dangerous tentacled alien) has begun to wreak havoc, approaching the crew members one by one and tentacle raping them to implant eggs in them. This causes the victims to become insane and die. Hikari finally learns this secret after decoding the computer records, but not before the Captain and several other crew members have already succumbed to Flair.

Hikari and her sister attempt to destroy Flair with weaponry, but the alien seems invincible.  Eventually, the alien corners the sisters in the ship's cargo hold. Hikari escapes but her sister does not, ending up locked in the hold with the alien. Seeking revenge, Hikari puts a Metrogria capsule in a pistol, re-enters the hold and shoots the alien, mortally wounding it. She then opens the cargo bay door and the alien is blown out into space along with several dead bodies.

The show has a post-credits sequence where "the real ending" is revealed, revealing Hikari's sister returning to the control room in a normal state to greet her, who Hikari embraces. As they hug, her sister shows an evil grin with the film ending with Hikari's pet snarling, leaving Hikari's fate unknown.

Characters
Hikari – Hikari is the main character of the movie. She is a computer expert for the Spaceship Muze. On a mission in space, her crew discovers a lifeless vessel called Zogne. Curious to see what's inside they gear up and board the ship. She has a pet ferret named Einstein.

Al – Al is the A.I. for the spaceship Muze.

Flair Mytomeyer – Flair is a mysterious girl with mint green hair found by the crew in a freeze chamber aboard the Zogne. She is the only survivor on the ship, as the rest of the passengers and crew have died mysteriously. She is treated by the crew of the Muze as a medical patient, although she can't remember what happened to her fellow passengers.

Annie – One of the crew members of the Muse and the first to go. She has a childlike personality.

Lindo – One of the crew members who is after the Metrogria with plans of selling it on the black market. She has a spoiled personality and is also a bit of a crybaby.

Keith – The tomboy of the crew and has a dislike for Lindo. She has the appearance of a teenage biker boy.

Hilda – The medic of the crew and is the captain's lover.

Captain Sara – The captain of the crew and is Hilda's lover. She has a masculine appearance just like Keith.

 Yuri – Hikari's sister and one of the crew members on the Muze.

Einstein – Hikari and Yuri's mischievous pet ferret who has a habit of sneaking off and slipping himself inside Hikari's clothes.

References

External links
 
 
 Alien from the Darkness (All the Tropes)

1996 anime OVAs
Hentai anime and manga
Pink Pineapple
Drama anime and manga
Action anime and manga
Science fiction anime and manga
Kitty Media
Extraterrestrials in anime and manga